Robert Reilly (born 23 September 1959) is a Scottish former football midfielder.

Reilly played with 11 Scottish clubs during his career, his most notable spell came arguably whilst playing for Clyde, where he made 168 appearances, scoring 28 goals.

External links

1959 births
Airdrieonians F.C. (1878) players
Albion Rovers F.C. players
Ayr United F.C. players
Clyde F.C. players
Dumbarton F.C. players
Hamilton Academical F.C. players
Kilmarnock F.C. players
Living people
Livingston F.C. players
Queen's Park F.C. players
Scottish Football League players
Scottish footballers
Stirling Albion F.C. players
Stranraer F.C. players
Association football midfielders